Tiffany Gouché (born September 20, 1988), also known as "TGooch", is an American singer, songwriter, and producer from Inglewood, California.

Background
Tiffany Gouché was born  September 20, 1988 in Inglewood, California. Gouché comes from a family she has described as musical and Christian.  She is the cousin of both Inglewood musicians SiR, and Netflix's Rhythm + Flow inaugural winner D Smoke. Growing up, the family would often perform together singing Gospel and jazz. In 2007, Gouché with her cousins formed a music collective by the name of Woodworks.

Musical career
Gouché garnered attention with her 2015 EP Pillow Talk. She has worked or shared the stage with Masego, Ty Dolla $ign, Solange, Anderson .Paak, Jill Scott, Lauryn Hill, Missy Elliot, Iggy Azalea, Usher, JMSN, Pussycat Dolls and Terrace Martin.

Gouché produced the entirety of Lalah Hathaway's 2017 Honestly.

Gouché also collaborated with Terrace Martin on his Grammy-nominated Velvet Portraits.

She is featured on the Little Simz tracks Closer, Just a Dose, and Heart Said.

While LionHeart featured songs sung from a heterosexual perspective (possibly because the mixtape was made up of polished demos of songs written for other artists), Gouché's later releases have fully embraced her lesbian identity.

Personal life
Gouchés mother passed away when she was 14 years old; Gouché identifies as queer and is in a relationship with singer King Sis.

Discography

Studio albums
 LionHeart (2012)
 Fantasy (2014)
 Pillow Talk (2015)
 Dive (2017)

As producer 
 This Joy (Resistance Revival Chorus album) (2020)
 Honestly (Lalah Hathaway album) (2017)
 "The Lights" by Little Simz (2015)
 "Heart Said" by Little Simz (2015)
 Seven Sundays (SiR album) (2015)
 "Closer" by Little Simz (2014)

As collaborator 

 "Queen Tings" with Masego (2018)
 "Love on Replay" with Kenyon Dixon (2022)

As featured artist 

 "Oracle" by Issa Ali 9also featuring Jessica Care Moore) (2021)
 "Shine" by Robert Glasper (also featuring D Smoke) (2021)
 "Love is You" by E R N E (2021)
 "End Love" by Gabe Pigeé (2021)
 "Ain't You" by D Smoke (2019)
 "Pastor" by JAG (2019)
 "Shit Covered in Gold" by Mac Ayres (2019)
 "It's a Man's World" by SiR (also featuring Asiahn) (2019)
 "Are You Listening" by SiR (2017)
 "Never Enough" by Terrace Martin (2016)
 "Heart Said" by Little Simz (2015)
 "Just a Dose" by Little Simz (2014)
 "Closer" by Little Simz (2014)
 "Bring it Back" by SiR (2014)
 "Gone" by Terrace Martin (2013)
 "In the Sky" by Terrace Martin (also featuring Emon) (2011)
 "Galaxy" by Ill Camille (2011)

As songwriter 

 "Shine" by Robert Glasper (2021)
 "You Ain't Ready" by SiR (2015)
 "Jahraymecofasola" by Jill Scott (2015)
 "Closer" by Little Simz (2014)
 "In the Sky" by Terrace Martin (also featuring Emon) (2011)
 "Takin' Over the World" by The Pussycat Dolls (2008)
 "How We Do It (In the UK) Remix" by Lloyd (2008)

Vocal credits 

 "Dat Feelin'" by Chris Dave and the Drumhedz (2018)
 Honestly (Lalah Hathaway album) (2017)
 "Set it Off" by Casey Veggies (2015)
 "Let Me" by Iman Omari (2014)
 "Testify" by Iman Omari (2013)
 The Way You See (Jackie Gouché album) (2008)

References

Musicians from Los Angeles
American LGBT musicians
Living people
1988 births
20th-century African-American women singers
LGBT African Americans
American LGBT scientists
LGBT hip hop musicians
LGBT people from California
Singers from California
21st-century American singers
21st-century American women singers
Queer women
Queer singers
21st-century African-American women singers